Wesley Johnson (born 1977), known by his stage name 2Play, is a British musician, record producer, and former mixed martial artist.

Music career
Johnson first entered the music scene in 1997 as a UK garage producer, under the aliases Wesley 2 Play and Special T. His first single under the name 2Play, "So Confused", was released in early 2004, and featured Canadian-Indian singer Raghav and MC Jucxi D. It reached number 6 on the UK Singles Chart, and won Best Collaboration at the MOBO Awards, and Best Single at the UK Asian Music Awards. A cover of Kevin Lyttle's "Turn Me On" appears on the "So Confused" single. The following single "It Can't Be Right", featuring Raghav and Naila Boss, was also a UK top 10 hit. The next single, a cover version of George Michael's "Careless Whisper", reached number 29. A house remix and a garage remix of "Careless Whisper" were also produced, under the alias Special T.

An album, including all the above singles, was produced and mastered in 2006, but never released at the time. 2Play independently released the album to digital platforms in 2019, under the title Back in Business.

Discography

Albums
Back in Business (2019)

Singles

Mixed martial arts

In addition to his music career, Johnson was also a mixed martial artist. He fought for Cage Rage and Ultimate Challenge MMA.

Record

|-
|Win
|align=center|5–1 (1)
|Simon Carington
|Submission (guillotine choke)
|UCMMA 11 – Adrenaline Rush
|
|align=center|1
|align=center|N/A
|London, England
|
|-
|Loss
|align=center|4–1 (1)
|Luke Smith
|TKO (punches)
|UCMMA 9 – Fighting for Heroes
|
|align=center|1
|align=center|4:09
|London, England
|
|-
|Win
|align=center|4–0 (1)
|Danny Fletcher
|Submission (flying triangle choke)
|UCMMA 6 – Payback
|
|align=center|1
|align=center|1:02
|London, England
|
|-
|Win
|align=center|3–0 (1)
|Alex Harvey
|Submission (triangle choke)
|UCMMA 5 – Heat
|
|align=center|1
|align=center|N/A
|London, England
|
|-
| NC
|align=center|2–0 (1)
|Scott Pooley
|No Contest
|UCMMA 2 – Unbreakable
|
|align=center|1
|align=center|N/A
|London, England
|
|-
|Win
|align=center|2–0
|Matt Smith
|Submission (triangle choke)
|Cage Rage 28 – VIP
|
|align=center|1
|align=center|0:44
|London, England
|
|-
|Win
|align=center|1–0
|Mark Brown
|TKO (punches)
|Cage Rage 27 – Step Up
|
|align=center|1
|align=center|0:31
|London, England
|

References

External links

2 Play Official YouTube site
Sherdog: Wesley Johnson page

1977 births
Living people
English dance musicians
English practitioners of Brazilian jiu-jitsu
People awarded a black belt in Brazilian jiu-jitsu
English male karateka
English record producers
English reggae musicians
British dancehall musicians
Musicians from London
UK garage musicians
English male mixed martial artists
Featherweight mixed martial artists
Mixed martial artists utilizing karate
Mixed martial artists utilizing Brazilian jiu-jitsu